Süreyyya Evren is a Turkish writer and cultural theorist.

Publications

Novels

Postmodern Bir Kız Sevdim (I Loved A Postmodern Girl, 1993)
Yaşayıp Ölmek Aşk ve Avarelik Üzerine Kısa Bir Roman (A Short Novel on Living and Dying, Love and Idleness, 1994)
Ur Lokantası (Tumor Restaurant, 1999)
 Viyana Nokta (2017)
 Yakınafrika (2018)

Short stories 
Zaman Zeman Öyküleri (Stories of Time, 1995)
Hepimiz Gogol'un Palto'sundan Çıktık (We All Came out of Gogol's Overcoat, 2001)
Buruşuk Arzular (Crumpled Desires, 2004).

Other
 User's Manual: Contemporary Art in Turkey 1986–2006 (2007)
 User's Manual 2.0: Contemporary Art in Turkey 1975–2015 (2015, co-editor)
Genç Şairler ve Yazarlar Kitabı (The Book of Young Poets and Writers, 1995)
"Bağbozumları-Kültür, Politika ve Gündelik Hayat Üzerine" ("Vintages, Culture, Politics and Daily Life", with Rahmi G. Öğdül, 2002)
 Post-Anarchism: A Reader (2011, co-editor) 
 Buluntu Kitap (2017)

See also
Cemal Süreya

References 

Living people
Anarchist theorists
Turkish atheism activists
Postanarchists
Poststructuralists
Turkish anarchists
Turkish former Muslims
Turkish communists
BirGün people
Year of birth missing (living people)